In physics, a Dirac fermion is a spin-½ particle (a fermion) which is different from its antiparticle. A vast majority of fermions fall under this category.

Description
In particle physics, all fermions in the standard model have distinct antiparticles (perhaps excepting neutrinos) and hence are Dirac fermions. They are named after Paul Dirac, and can be modeled with the Dirac equation.

A Dirac fermion is equivalent to two Weyl fermions. The counterpart to a Dirac fermion is a Majorana fermion, a particle that must be its own antiparticle.

Dirac quasi-particles
In condensed matter physics, low-energy excitations in graphene and topological insulators, among others, are fermionic quasiparticles described by a pseudo-relativistic Dirac equation.

See also
 Dirac spinor, a wavefunction-like description of a Dirac fermion
 Dirac–Kähler fermion, a geometric formulation of Dirac fermions
 Majorana fermion, an alternate category of fermion, possibly describing neutrinos
 Spinor, mathematical details

References

Fermions